Dilophia is a genus of flowering plants belonging to the family Brassicaceae.

Its native range is Central Asia to Himalaya and China.

Species:

Dilophia ebracteata 
Dilophia salsa

References

Brassicaceae
Brassicaceae genera